Steve Hollar (born c. 1966) is an American actor known for his role as Rade Butcher in the 1986 film Hoosiers starring Gene Hackman.

Hollar was a member of DePauw University's basketball team when Hoosiers was filmed in 1985. Because NCAA rules prohibit athletes from being paid for playing sports during their college eligibility, Hollar was suspended for three games in November 1986, shortly after the movie's world premiere. The following month he also was ordered to return 5% of his movie earnings.

Hollar appeared in three films: Hoosiers (1986), Hell on the Battleground (1988), and New Life (2017). He used his earnings to pay for dental school and today works as a dentist in Warsaw, Indiana, his hometown.

His son, Bennett, works as a dentist with Hollar.

References

External links
  Article catching up on the 'Hoosiers' stars
  1986 story with video clip
  Story marking 20th anniversary of film's release

Male actors from Indiana
Living people
DePauw Tigers men's basketball players
People from Warsaw, Indiana
1960s births
American men's basketball players